The Right Temptation is a 2000 American mystery erotic thriller film directed by Lyndon Chubbuck and starring Kiefer Sutherland, Rebecca De Mornay and Dana Delany.

The film is the second collaboration between Kiefer Sutherland and Rebecca De Mornay, the first being The Three Musketeers (1993).

Plot 
A former police officer, Derian McCall (Rebecca De Mornay), hands in her badge then she and a colleague, opens a detective agency. One day Anthea (Dana Delany) walks in, the wife of a wealthy investor, Michael Ferrow-Smith (Kiefer Sutherland). Anthea asks Derian to flirt with Michael to see if he is unfaithful, but soon Derian is having an affair with him, not realizing that Anthea has planned a complicated murder.

Cast
 Kiefer Sutherland as Michael Farrow-Smith
 Rebecca De Mornay as Derian McCall
 Dana Delany as Anthea Farrow-Smith
 Adam Baldwin as Captain Wagner
 Joanna Cassidy as Maryanne
 Michael Ralph as Falco
 Robert Jayne as Travis
 Neil Flynn as Max

Production
The film was shot in Utah, United States.

External links
 
 

2000 films
2000s crime thriller films
2000 independent films
2000s mystery thriller films
American crime thriller films
American independent films
American mystery thriller films
American thriller drama films
2000s English-language films
2000s American films